Vergès is a French surname. It may refer to:

 Jacques Vergès (1925–2013), French lawyer known for defending war criminals
 Paul Vergès (1925–2016), French (Reunionese) politician
 Raymond Vergès (1882–1957), French politician

See also 

 Verges (disambiguation)

Surnames of French origin